Lidia Lupu (19 May 1953 – 13 November 2021) was a Moldovan politician. A member of the Party of Socialists of the Republic of Moldova, she served in the Parliament of the Republic of Moldova from 2014 to 2019. In 2003, she was awarded the  medal.

References

1953 births
2021 deaths
21st-century Moldovan politicians
Party of Socialists of the Republic of Moldova politicians
Members of the parliament of Moldova